Charles William Martin (September 17, 1887 – March 14, 1978) was an American football player, track athlete, and sports coach.  He served as the head football coach at the University of North Carolina at Chapel Hill for one season in 1912, compiling a record of 3–4–1.

Head coaching record

Football

References

External links
 

1887 births
1978 deaths
American football ends
American male sprinters
Harvard Crimson track and field coaches
North Carolina Tar Heels football coaches
Notre Dame Fighting Irish football players
Notre Dame Fighting Irish men's track and field athletes
Penn State Nittany Lions track and field coaches
Whitman Fighting Missionaries football coaches
Whitman Fighting Missionaries football players
College track and field coaches in the United States
People from Walla Walla County, Washington
Players of American football from Washington (state)